The Chase Vault Tragedy is the first demo by Dutch symphonic black metal band Carach Angren. The CD was released on September 1, 2004, and is a concept album about the mystery of the burial vault of Chase Vault in Barbados. Pro-printed CD-R comes without back cover artwork. It was limited to 100 copies.

Track listing 
All music and impressions by Carach Angren 2003/2004
All lyrics by Seregor

Personnel 
 Dennis "Seregor" Droomers – vocals and guitars
 Clemens "Ardek" Wijers – keyboards and piano, backing vocals 
 Ivo "Namtar" Wijers – drums and percussion

References

2004 EPs
Carach Angren albums